is a Japanese animator, storyboard artist, and director. Some of his major works directed include The King of Braves GaoGaiGar, Betterman, and Brigadoon: Marin & Melan. He also directed the anime adaptation of Food Wars!: Shokugeki no Soma.

Works (as director) 
 The Laughing Salesman (1989-1992)
 2112: The Birth of Doraemon
 Dorami & Doraemons: Robot School's Seven Mysteries
 The King of Braves GaoGaiGar
 Betterman
 The King of Braves GaoGaiGar Final
 Brigadoon: Marin & Melan
 Nurse Witch Komugi (Episodes 3 - 5)
 Nurse Witch Komugi-Chan Magikarte Z (Episode 2)
 Amuri in Star Ocean
 Urusei Yatsura: The Obstacle Course Swim Meet
 Dororon Enma-kun Meeramera
 Food Wars!: Shokugeki no Soma (2015-2020)
 Vatican Miracle Examiner

References

External links

Sunrise (company) people
Anime directors
People from Tokyo
1963 births
Living people